Shibuya is one of the 23 special wards of Tokyo, Japan. Named after it are:

 Shibuya Station, a train station located in Shibuya, Tokyo
 Shibuya-kei, a subgenre of Japanese pop music

People
 Shibuya (surname)

See also
 Shibutani
 Shibuya Fifteen, a 2005 Japanese television drama
 Kōza-Shibuya Station, a train station on the Odakyū Enoshima Line, Japan